Hypolycaena ithna is a species of butterfly of the family Lycaenidae. It is found on the Philippines (Mindanao and Cebu).

References

Butterflies described in 1869
Hypolycaenini
Butterflies of Asia
Taxa named by William Chapman Hewitson